The Crabstane (alt. Crabs Stone, Craibstone, Craib Stone, Craibstane or Crabe Stone) is a boundary stone that used to mark out part of Craibstone Croft which was located near Hardgate, Aberdeen.

The stone has a plaque above it with the inscription as follows:

The Crabstane. Boundary stone on lands belonging to John Crab, Baillie of the Burgh in 1314.

The stone also marks the site of the skirmish in 1571 between the rival families of Gordon and Forbes and of an engagement in 1644 between the citizens of Aberdeen and the Royalist forces of the Marquis of Montrose.

The skirmish refers to the Battle of Craibstone on 20 November 1571.

References

History of Aberdeen
Buildings and structures in Aberdeen
Monuments and memorials in Aberdeen